is a girls' private junior and senior high school in Tennoji-ku, Osaka. It is a part of the Shi-Tennoji Gakuen, a group of Buddhist educational institutions affiliated with Shitennoji temple in Osaka.

Notable alumnae

Actresses
Yoko Akino
Mitsuki Takahata
Reon Yuzuki

Synchronized swimmers
Miho Takeda
Fumiko Okuno
Miya Tachibana
Mayuko Fujiki
Yoko Yoneda

Volleyball players
Katsumi Matsumura
Kinuko Tanida
Sata Isobe
Yoshiko Matsumura
Michiko Shiokawa
Sachiko Otani
Kiyomi Sakamoto
Mariko Mori

Table tennis players
Kasumi Ishikawa
Yukie Ozeki
An Konishi
Reiko Sakamoto
Hiroko Fujii
Ai Fujinuma
Haruna Fukuoka
Reiko Hiura

Handball players
Mineko Tanaka
Mika Nagata
Yui Sunami
Asuka Fujita
Sato Shiroishi

Other
Kumiko Ogura, badminton player
Yoriko Okamoto, taekwondo practitioner
Midori Ito, figure skater

References

External links
 Shitennoji Junior and Senior High School 

Education in Osaka
1922 establishments in Japan
Educational institutions established in 1922
Private schools in Japan
Buddhism in Japan
High schools in Osaka Prefecture
Shitennō-ji
Girls' schools in Japan